Stage Door is a Canadian music variety television series which aired on CBC Television in 1960.

Premise
Lloyd Robertson hosted this Winnipeg-produced series with regular performers Georges LaFleche, Norma Vadeboncoeur and the Stage Four vocal quartet. Music was directed by Bob McMullin.

Scheduling
This half-hour series was broadcast Sundays at 1:00 p.m. (Eastern) from 17 January to 10 April 1960.

References

External links
 

CBC Television original programming
1960 Canadian television series debuts
1960 Canadian television series endings